Arpaçay is a town and a district of Kars Province in the Eastern Anatolia region of Turkey.

Arpaçay or Arpa çay or Arpachay may also refer to:

 Arpaçay, Azerbaijan
 Arpaçay River or the Akhurian River, a river in the South Caucasus.
 Arpaçay Dam, a dam in Armenia and Turkey

See also
 Arpa Chai (disambiguation)